Rasmus Rinne (born 8 July 1990) is a Finnish professional ice hockey goaltender currently an unrestricted free agent. He most recently played with the Dornbirn Bulldogs in the Austrian Hockey League (EBEL).

Rinne made his Liiga debut playing with Ässät during the 2013–14 Liiga season. He played the 2016–17 season for Sport.

References

External links

1990 births
Living people
Ässät players
Dornbirn Bulldogs players
Finnish ice hockey goaltenders
Lukko players
Vaasan Sport players
People from Hyvinkää
Sportspeople from Uusimaa